Amanda Landers-Murphy (born 7 June 1991 in Rotorua) is a professional squash player who represents New Zealand. She reached a career-high world ranking of world No. 35 in February 2013. Of Māori descent, Landers-Murphy affiliates to Te Āti Awa. She won the 2021 Liquorland Howick PSA Open and the 2017 North Shore Open.

References

External links 

1991 births
Living people
Sportspeople from Rotorua
New Zealand female squash players
Commonwealth Games gold medallists for New Zealand
Commonwealth Games medallists in squash
Squash players at the 2014 Commonwealth Games
Squash players at the 2018 Commonwealth Games
Te Āti Awa people
New Zealand Māori sportspeople
20th-century New Zealand women
21st-century New Zealand women
Squash players at the 2022 Commonwealth Games
Medallists at the 2018 Commonwealth Games
Medallists at the 2022 Commonwealth Games